Martin Baehr (10 March 1943 – 17 April 2019) was a German entomologist who mostly worked on ground beetles (Carabidae), but also spiders, grasshoppers and other taxa. He described and named more than 2.000 species, mostly from Southeast Asia and Australia. He studied biology at the university of Tübingen. Initially, his doctoral thesis was supervised by Willi Hennig, who, however died before Baehr´s graduation. Baehr was curator at the Zoologische Staatssammlung München, at first in charge of Heteroptera and Orthoptera, later of Coleoptera. For many years he worked as the managing editor of the zoological journal Spixiana. One of his most comprehensive taxonomic revisions treated the subfamily Pseudomorphinae.
In addition to scholarly works, Baehr has written a number of popular books including Welcher Käfer ist das? ("What Beetle is This?") published by Stuttgart-based publishing company Kosmos.

References

German entomologists
1943 births
2019 deaths